History Upside Down: The Roots of Palestinian Fascism and the Myth of Israeli Aggression, is a book by author David Meir-Levi, published by Encounter Books in 2007.

David Meir-Levi is a graduate of Johns Hopkins University and has a graduate degree in Near Eastern Studies from Brandeis University.

References

2007 non-fiction books
Israeli–Palestinian conflict books
American non-fiction books
Encounter Books books